John Robert Cozens (1752 – 14 December 1797) was a British draftsman and painter of romantic watercolour landscapes.

Cozens executed watercolors in curious atmospheric effects and illusions which had an influence on Thomas Girtin and J.M.W. Turner. Indeed, his work is full of poetry. There is a solemn grandeur in his Alpine views and a sense of vastness, a tender tranquility and a kind of mystery in most of his paintings, leaving parts in his pictures for the imagination of the spectator to dwell on and search into. John Constable described Cozens as "the greatest genius that ever touched landscape."

In June 2010 Cozen's Lake Albano (c.1777) sold at auction, at Sotheby's in London, for £2.4 million, a record for any 18th-century British watercolour.

Biography
The son of the Russian-born drawing master and watercolourist Alexander Cozens, John Robert Cozens was born in London. He studied under his father and began to exhibit some early drawings with the Society of Artists in 1767. In 1776 he displayed the large oil painting, A Landscape with Hannibal in His March Over the Alps, Showing to His Army the Fertile Plains of Italy (now lost) at the Royal Academy in London. This painting was the only oil that Cozens exhibited at the Academy and was the inspiration for J. M. W. Turner's famous painting of 1812.

Between 1776 and 1779 he spent some time in Switzerland and Italy, where he drew Alpine and Italian views, and in 1779 he returned to London. In 1782 he made his second visit to Italy, accompanied by the author William Beckford, spending much time at Naples. In 1783 he returned to England. In 1789 he published a set of Delineations of the General Character ... of Forest Trees. He submitted his work to the Royal Academy but it was entirely rejected, being judged as "not proper art".

At the age of 42, three years before he died, he suffered a nervous breakdown and was committed to the Bethlem Royal Hospital asylum. The chief physician there was Dr. Thomas Monro who, also being a keen art collector, recognised Cozens' brilliance and bought his collection. Cozens died in London.

Public collections
 Rijksmuseum Amsterdam
 Gallery Oldham

See also
English school of painting

References

Further reading
 K. Sloan, Alexander and John Robert Cozens The Poetry of Landscape (1986)
 A. P. Oppe, Alexander and John Robert Cozens (1952)

External links

Artcyclopedia: John Robert Cozens

1752 births
1797 deaths
18th-century English male artists
18th-century English painters
English male painters
English romantic painters
Landscape artists
English watercolourists
Painters from London
British draughtsmen